Jongensland (Dutch: “Boysland”) was a playground for Dutch children built in the aftermath of World War II as an attempt by urban planners and child psychologists to undo fascist  ideas of child development.

It was established in 1948 on an island in eastern Amsterdam, and  allowed boys and girls to build simple strictures and play without adult supervision. The island was only accessible by boat.

References

Further reading
Ursula Schulz-Dornburg, Huts, Temples, Castles, Mack, 2022

Parks in Amsterdam
Child development
Developmental psychology
Childhood
Playgrounds
Play (activity)
Outdoor recreation